The Wynne Baronetcy, of Leeswood Hall, Leeswood in the County of Flint, was a title in the Baronetage of Great Britain. It was created on 9 August 1731 for George Wynne, subsequently Member of Parliament for Flint Boroughs. The title became extinct on the death of the third Baronet some time between 1764 and 1792.

Wynne baronets, of Lees Wood (1731)
Sir George Wynne, 1st Baronet (1700–1756)
Sir John Wynne, 2nd Baronet (1702–1764)
Sir John Wynne, 3rd Baronet (died before 1793)

See also
Wynn baronets of Gwydir and Bodvean
Winn baronets of Nostell Priory

References

Extinct baronetcies in the Baronetage of Great Britain